Jacob Funk House and Barn is a historic home located at Springfield Township, Bucks County, Pennsylvania. The house consists of three sections; the oldest built about 1792. It is a -story, stone dwelling measuring 40 feet wide and 28 feet deep and originally reflective of the Georgian style.  The oldest section is a two-story, two bay, stone structure two rooms deep. About 1855, a two-story, three-bay extension was added to the east gable.  A kitchen and bath addition was built about 1930.  The house was remodeled in the Colonial Revival style between about 1945 and 1955, at which time a one-story addition and deck were added to the rear of the house.  Also on the property are a contributing stone bank barn (c. 1810) and stone spring house (c. 1855).

It was added to the National Register of Historic Places in 2007.

References

Houses on the National Register of Historic Places in Pennsylvania
Georgian architecture in Pennsylvania
Colonial Revival architecture in Pennsylvania
Houses in Bucks County, Pennsylvania
Barns on the National Register of Historic Places in Pennsylvania
Barns in Pennsylvania
National Register of Historic Places in Bucks County, Pennsylvania